Legs is a 1975 novel by William Kennedy. It is the first book in Kennedy's Albany Cycle.

Plot summary
The book chronicles the life of the gangster Jack 'Legs' Diamond. It is told from the perspective of Jack's lawyer, Marcus Gorman. Marcus becomes involved with "Legs" Diamond to add excitement to his otherwise boring life, and the best way to do this was by immortalizing a highly popular gangster. Through Gorman's eyes, Kennedy is able to elicit sympathy for the criminal, transposing this sympathy into the context of America during the 1920s and 30s: excess, collapse, destitution, and analysis of right and wrong, good and evil.

Adaptations 

In 2009, Audible.com produced an audio version of Legs, narrated by Joe Barrett, as part of its Modern Vanguard line of audiobooks.

1975 American novels
Biographical novels
Novels set in the United States
Novels set in the 1920s
Novels set in the 1930s
Novels by William Kennedy
Cultural depictions of Legs Diamond
Coward-McCann books